Douglas Cameron White (October 2, 1944 – August 15, 2006) was an American news anchor.

A native of Boston, Massachusetts and an alumnus of Bates College, White's first work in television was at WGBH-TV while at Boston University on a work fellowship.  White worked at WPRI-TV, located in Providence, Rhode Island for six years.  He then joined NBC's WJAR-TV (later WJAR), located in Cranston, Rhode Island in 1978, anchoring the 6PM and 11PM newscasts during that time and adding the 5PM edition in 2001.

Before that, he worked at WSMW-TV in Worcester, Massachusetts, and WLBZ-TV in Bangor, Maine.

He went on medical leave in 2005 due to cancer, which was the cause of his death at his home in Warwick, Rhode Island on August 15, 2006, at the age of 61.

External links and references
 The Boston Globe's coverage of White's death
"NBC 10's Doug White passes away" - WJAR website

1944 births
2006 deaths
Television anchors from Boston
People from Providence, Rhode Island
Bates College alumni
Deaths from cancer in Rhode Island